L33 may refer to:
 CITER 155mm L33 Gun, an Argentinian artillery field gun
 General Motors L33 engine
 , a submarine of the Royal Navy
 , a destroyer of the Royal Navy
 Let L-33 Solo, a Czech glider
 Mitochondrial ribosomal protein L33
 Nissan Altima (L33), a Japanese automobile
 Zeppelin LZ 76, an airship of the Imperial German Navy